Robert Delebarre (born 19 January 1941) is a French weightlifter. He competed in the men's lightweight event at the 1960 Summer Olympics.

References

1941 births
Living people
French male weightlifters
Olympic weightlifters of France
Weightlifters at the 1960 Summer Olympics
Sportspeople from Pas-de-Calais